Þórólfur Guðnason (born 28 October 1953) is an Icelandic doctor who serverd as the Chief Epidemiologist of the Icelandic Directorate of Health from 2015 2022. He was one of the lead members of the Iceland's Department of Civil Protection and Emergency Management addressing the COVID-19 pandemic in Iceland, along with Alma Möller and Víðir Reynisson.

Early life and education
Þórólfur grew up in Eskifjörður and later in Vestmannaeyjar where he lived until the age of 19.

He specialized in pediatrics and pediatric infectious disease. In 2013 he defended his doctoral thesis on the epidemiology of pneumococcal infections in young Icelandic children.

Career

Chief Epidemiologist of Iceland
The vaccination of Icelandic children aged 12 to 15 began on August 22, 2021, with only the Pfizer/BioNTech used, with Chief Epidemiologist Þórólfur Guðnason stating to the public that vaccinating children was "the right thing to do". By November 9, 2021, 30,000 people had received a booster shot in Iceland, or 76% of the total population, and of those people, 10 had contracted COVID. Guðnason stated that of the around 270,000 people who were fully vaccinated, 4,500 or 1.6% had contracted COVID. At the time, eligible age groups did not include those under 12 years old.

See also
COVID-19 vaccination in Iceland

References

1953 births
Living people
20th-century Icelandic  physicians
21st-century Icelandic  physicians
Thorolfur Gudnason
Thorolfur Gudnason
Thorolfur Gudnason
Thorolfur Gudnason